Maria Rita Gertrudes of Braganza (1731 in Lisbon – 1808 in Lisbon) was a Portuguese nun, and the illegitimate daughter of John V of Portugal and Luísa Clara de Portugal. She was a nun at the Convent of Santos.

1731 births
1808 deaths
18th-century Portuguese people
19th-century Portuguese people
18th-century Portuguese women
19th-century Portuguese women
People from Lisbon
Illegitimate children of John V of Portugal
Daughters of kings